Outbound content compliance or outbound content security is a relatively new segment of the computer security field, which aims to detect and prevent outbound content that violates policy of the organization and/or government regulations. It deals with internal threats, as opposite to more traditional security solutions (firewall, anti-virus, anti-spam etc.), that are dealing with external threats.  Therefore, it is sometimes called inside-out security.

Business environment
In the business environment, the purpose is to prevent confidential and/or private data leaks.  The protected information may belong to the company itself or to its customers.  US, Canada, European and some other countries enacted laws, mandating protection of some types of the computer-based information.  Some of the US laws, including related provisions: Sarbanes-Oxley, HIPAA, Gramm-Leach-Bliley Act.

The interest to the segment was heated after a string of high-profile data breaches, when personal information of millions of people was stolen or endangered.

See also
 Information Leak Prevention
 Data Loss Prevention

Related terms
 information leak detection and prevention
 outbound content monitoring
 inside-out security

References

Regulatory compliance
Computer network security